Tiago Daniel Rodrigues Dias (born 4 May 1998) is a Portuguese professional footballer who plays as a forward for Feirense.

Club career

Milan
Dias transferred to Milan's youth academy in August 2017 from Benfica. In his debut season for Primavera (the club's U-19 team), he made 35 appearances, scoring 7 goals and assisting 4 times.

He received his first ever call-up to the senior team ahead of a home Serie A game against Chievo Verona played on 18 March 2018; he, however, remained an unused substitute. In May, he was also among the substitutes for the team's last game of the season against Fiorentina but did not play.

Braga B
On 1 September 2018, Dias was sent out to LigaPro club Braga B on a season-long loan with option to buy.

Famalicão
On 28 August 2019, Dias joined Famalicão on a permanent deal. Dias was registered for the club's B-team.

Feirense
On 9 July 2021, he moved to Feirense.

Style of play
Dias is a left-footed right winger, who can also play in a number 10 role.
An agile, quick, and fast attacking player, he is known for his dribbling, ball control, and shooting from a long range.

References

External links

Tiago Dias at playmakerstats.com (English version of zerozero.pt)

1998 births
Living people
Association football forwards
Portuguese footballers
Portuguese expatriate footballers
S.L. Benfica B players
A.C. Milan players
S.C. Braga B players
S.C. Olhanense players
C.D. Feirense players
Liga Portugal 2 players
Campeonato de Portugal (league) players
Portuguese expatriate sportspeople in Italy
Expatriate footballers in Italy
Footballers from Lisbon